Wetmore Glacier is a glacier about 40 miles (64 km) long, flowing southeast between the Rare Range and Latady Mountains into the north part of Gardner Inlet. It was discovered by the Ronne Antarctic Research Expedition (RARE), 1947–48, under Ronne, who named this feature for Alexander Wetmore, Secretary of the Smithsonian Institution, who assisted Ronne in laying out the scientific research program of the expedition.

See also
 List of glaciers in the Antarctic
 Glaciology

References

Glaciers of Palmer Land